Alexandre Tokpa (born 16 November 1985) is an Ivorian footballer. He lased played as a midfielder for KRC Mechelen in Belgium.

Career 
Before he played for Beveren and K.S.V. Roeselare.

References

1985 births
Living people
Ivorian footballers
K.S.K. Beveren players
ASEC Mimosas players
K.S.V. Roeselare players
K.R.C. Mechelen players
Footballers from Abidjan
Association football midfielders